The year 1966 saw the peak and the end of the Gemini program. The program proved that docking in space and human EVA's could be done safely. It saw the first launch of the Saturn IB rocket, an important step in the Apollo program, and the launch of Luna 9, the first spacecraft to make a soft landing on a celestial object (the Moon).

Launches

|colspan=8|

January
|-

|colspan=8|

February
|-

|colspan=8|

March
|-

|-

|-

|-

|-

|-

|-

|-

|-

|-

|-

|-

|colspan=8|

April
|-

|-

|-

|-

|-

|-

|-

|-

|-

|colspan=8|

May
|-

|-

|-

|-

|-

|-

|-

|-

|-

|-

|-

|-

|-

|-
|colspan=8|

June
|-

|-

|-

|-

|-

|-

|-

|-

|-

|-

|-

|-

|-
|colspan=8|

July
|-

|-

|-

|-

|-

|-

|-

|-

|-

|-

|-

|-

|-
|colspan=8|

August
|-

|-

|-

|-

|-

|-

|-

|-

|-

|-

|-

|-

|-
|colspan=8|

September
|-

|-

|-

|-

|-

|-

|-

|-

|-

|-

|-
|colspan=8|

October
|-

|-

|-

|-

|-

|-

|-

|-

|-

|-

|-
|colspan=8|

November
|-

|-

|-

|-

|-

|-

|-

|-

|-

|-

|-

|-
|colspan=8|

December
|-

|-

|-

|-

|-

|-

|-

|-

|-

|-

|-

|-

|-

|colspan=8|
|}

Gemini and Apollo launches

Deep Space Rendezvous

EVAs

References

Footnotes

 
Spaceflight by year